Antoni Trimboli (born 30 July 1996) is an Australian professional footballer who plays as a striker for Adelaide United. He'd previously played with Perugia in Italy.

References

External links
 
 Player profile at ESPN FC

Living people
1996 births
Association football forwards
Australian soccer players
National Premier Leagues players
A.C. Perugia Calcio players
A-League Men players
Adelaide United FC players
Adelaide Comets FC players
Croydon Kings players